Luca Bischeri (born 12 June 1979) is an Italian baseball player who competed in the 2004 Summer Olympics.

References

1979 births
Baseball players at the 2004 Summer Olympics
Living people
Olympic baseball players of Italy
Grosseto Baseball Club players
Fortitudo Baseball Bologna players